Kathleen M. Cates is an American politician serving as a member of the New Mexico House of Representatives for the 44th district. Elected in November 2022, she assumed office on January 1, 2023.

Career 
Prior to entering politics, Cates worked for a jewelry company, e-commerce manager for Goodwill Industries of New Mexico, and CEO of a non-profit. Since 2021, Cates has also worked as a realtor. She was elected to the New Mexico House of Representatives in November 2022.

References 

Living people
New Mexico Democrats
Members of the New Mexico House of Representatives
Women state legislators in New Mexico
American real estate businesspeople
People from Rio Rancho, New Mexico
Year of birth missing (living people)